Charles Herbert Joyce (January 30, 1830November 22, 1916) was an American lawyer and politician. He served as a  U.S. Representative from Vermont.

Biography
Joyce was born near Andover, Hampshire, England to Charles Joyce and Martha E. Grist Joyce. At the age of six, in 1836, he immigrated to the United States with his parents, who settled in Waitsfield, Vermont.

He attended Waitsfield Academy and Northfield Academy before entering Newbury Seminary. He was a page in the Vermont House of Representatives for three sessions. While studying law with Francis V. Randall, John L. Buck, and Farrand F. Merrill, Joyce taught school to support himself. He was admitted to the bar in 1852. He began the practice of law in Northfield, Vermont in 1855.

Joyce spent one year as assistant state librarian, then two years as the state librarian. He served as the State's Attorney of Washington County in 1857 and 1858.

When the American Civil War broke out, he served in the Union Army as major and lieutenant colonel of the Second Vermont Volunteers. After the war he resumed his legal practice in Rutland, Vermont and entered politics, serving as a member of the Vermont House of Representatives from 1869 until 1872. He was the speaker from 1870 and 1872.

Joyce was elected as a Republican candidate to the Forty-fourth Congress and to the three succeeding Congresses, serving from March 4, 1875 until March 3, 1883. He was not a candidate for renomination in 1882. After leaving office he again resumed his legal practice in Rutland, Vermont.

He retired from his legal practice in 1895. Joyce resided in Pittsfield, Vermont until his death on November 22, 1916. He is interred in Evergreen Cemetery in Rutland, Vermont.

Personal life
Joyce was married to Rouene Randall Joyce, the sister of Francis V. Randall. They had three children: Inez Rouene Joyce, Grace Randall Joyce, and Charles P.F. Joyce.

See also

References

Further reading
 "Genealogical and Family History of the State of Vermont: A Record of the Achievements of Her People in the Making of a Commonwealth and the Founding of a Nation, Volume 1" by Hiram Carleton, published by Lewis Publishing Company, 1903.

External links
 
 Biographical Directory of the United States Congress: JOYCE, Charles Herbert, (1830 - 1916)
 
 Govtrack.us: Rep. Charles Joyce
 The Political Graveyard: Joyce, Charles Herbert (1830-1916)
 History50States.com: Biography of Charles Herbert Joyce

1830 births
1916 deaths
Vermont Brigade
People of Vermont in the American Civil War
Union Army officers
Republican Party members of the Vermont House of Representatives
Speakers of the Vermont House of Representatives
Burials at Evergreen Cemetery (Rutland, Vermont)
Republican Party members of the United States House of Representatives from Vermont
Vermont lawyers
19th-century American politicians
English emigrants to the United States
19th-century American lawyers